Estuary English is an English accent associated with the area along the River Thames and its estuary, including London. Phonetician John C. Wells proposed a definition of Estuary English as "Standard English spoken with the accent of the southeast of England". He views Estuary English as an emerging standard accent of England: an "intermediate" between the 20th-century higher-class non-regional standard accent, Received Pronunciation, and the 20th-century lower-class local London accent, Cockney. There is some debate among linguists as to where Cockney speech ends and Estuary English begins.

Name
Cruttenden uses the term London Regional General British in preference to the popular term 'Estuary English'.

The names listed above may be abbreviated:
 Estuary English → EE
 London Regional General British → London RGB

Wells has used different names for an accent closer to Cockney (Popular London) or closer to Received Pronunciation (London Regional Standard or South-Eastern Regional Standard). Cruttenden uses the name Popular London to refer to Cockney pronunciation itself.

Status as accent of English
The boundaries between RP (Received Pronunciation), Estuary English and Cockney are far from clear-cut. Wells cites Rosewarne as locating EE in the middle of "a continuum that has RP and London speech at either end". Several writers have argued that Estuary English is not a discrete accent distinct from the accents of the London area. The sociolinguist Peter Trudgill has written that the term "Estuary English" is inappropriate because "it suggests that we are talking about a new variety, which we are not; and because it suggests that it is a variety of English confined to the banks of the Thames estuary, which it is not. The label actually refers to the lower middle-class accents, as opposed to working-class accents, of the Home Counties Modern Dialect area". Roach comments, "In reality there is no such accent and the term should be used with care. The idea originates from the sociolinguistic observation that some people in public life who would previously have been expected to speak with an RP accent now find it acceptable to speak with some characteristics of the London area... such as glottal stops, which would in earlier times have caused comment or disapproval".

 state "All of its [EE's] features can be located on a sociolinguistic and geographical continuum between RP and Cockney, and are spreading not because Estuary English is a coherent and identifiable influence, but because the features represent neither the standard nor the extreme non-standard poles of the continuum". In order to tackle these problems put forward by expert linguists,  argues that Estuary English should be viewed as a folk category rather than an expert linguistic category. As such it takes the form of a perceptual prototype category that does not require discrete boundaries in order to function in the eyes (and ears) of lay observers of language variation and change.

Collins et al. state that "In the 1990s and the first few years of the 2000s, this putative new variety was fiercely debated both in the media and academia, but since then interest in Estuary English has waned and been replaced by discussion of the capital's latest linguistic innovation – Multicultural London English".

Features
Published accounts of EE describe it mainly in terms of differences from contemporary RP and from Cockney. Wells (1994) states that "Estuary English (EE) is like RP, but unlike Cockney, in being associated with standard grammar and usage". Differences are found at phonemic and allophonic levels.

Features distinguishing EE from RP
Wells identifies a small number of key features that may distinguish EE from RP: these features may be summarized as follows:

 /l/-vocalization
 /t/-glottalization
 diphthong shift
 yod-coalescence

Features suggested by other studies

 th-fronting
 other vowel differences

/l/-vocalization
It has been widely observed that EE exhibits vocalization of preconsonantal/final /l/, perhaps with various vowel mergers before it (an informal example being miwk-bottoo 'milk-bottle'). Wells cites the specific case of allophony in GOAT (> [ɒʊ] before dark /l/ or its reflex), leading perhaps to a phonemic split ('wholly' vs. 'holy'). This topic is usually referred to as L-vocalization. There is said to be alternation between the vocalized , dark non-vocalized  and clear non-vocalized , depending on the word. These alternation happen in final positions or in a final consonant cluster, e.g. sold (pronounced ). In London, that may even occur before a vowel: girl out . In all phonetic environments, male London speakers were at least twice as likely to vocalize the dark l as female London speakers.

/l/-vocalization can lead to loss of distinctions between some vowels and diphthongs. Examples of vowel mergers before historic  found in EE are:

 Other possible mergers include the following:

 found coda  pronounced as clear , as in most accents of Irish English, in some speakers: she notes that in her study, "all four Essex speakers have a clear  in pull."

/l/-vocalization appears to be spreading into RP (or GB, the similar accent referred to by some writers). Collins et al say "Traditional RP speakers tend to stigmatize this feature, which is nevertheless one of the most striking changes going on in present-day GB English".

/t/-glottalization 
The term glottalization has several different meanings: the most important are  glottal reinforcement (or pre-glottalization), where a glottal closure accompanies an oral closure, and glottal replacement, where a glottal closure is substituted for an oral consonant. 

Although glottalization of /t/ has been singled out for attention in discussion of EE features, pre-glottalization of /p/, /k/ and /tʃ/ is also widespread in RP, particularly when another consonant follows. Examples are 'popcorn' ['pɒʔpkɔːn], 'electric' [ɪ'leʔktrɪk], 'butcher' ['bʊʔtʃə]. 
Wells proposes that in transcribing EE, the glottal stop symbol [ʔ] could be used in contexts where the consonant in question is preceded by a vowel and followed by a consonant or the end of a word: examples are 'bit' [bɪʔ],	'football' [ˈfʊʔbɔo], 'belt' [beoʔ], 'Cheltenham' [ˈtʃeoʔnəm], 'bent' [benʔ], 'Bentley'	[ˈbenʔli].
Pre-glottalization of /t/ therefore appears to be present both in RP and in EE.

Glottal replacement of /t/ may be found when /t/ occurs before another consonant. Examples from RP where /t/ is replaced by a glottal stop are: 'that table' [ðæʔ 'teɪbəl], 'Scotland' ['skɒʔlənd], 'witness' ['wɪʔnəs]. The most extreme case of glottal replacement is when a glottal stop takes the place of /t/ between vowels (normally when the preceding vowel is stressed). Examples are 'not on' [ˌnɒʔ 'ɒn], 'bottle' ['bɒʔo]. Wells says "glottalling word-internally before a vowel is well-known as a 'rough' pronunciation variant: thus EE water ˈwɔːtə, but Cockney ˈwɔʊʔə". However, in work published twenty years later, Cruttenden (p 184) remarks that such glottal replacement "was until recently stigmatized as non-GB but all except [ʔl̩] are now acceptable in London RGB" (i.e. EE). He continues "Use of [ʔ] for /t/ word-medially intervocalically, as in water, still remains stigmatized in GB".

Diphthong shift
EE is said to exhibit diphthong shift, particularly of the FACE, PRICE, MOUTH and GOAT vowels (informal example: "nime" for "name").
  (as in ) may be realised in a couple of different ways. The last two are more often used by females.
 board  may be pronounced differently from bored . However,  states that both  and  may have the same monophthongal quality .

Yod-coalescence

Although at the time when most studies of EE were carried out, yod-coalescence was not common in RP, it has now become so widely accepted that RP-based pronunciation dictionaries include it. Thus the latest edition of the Cambridge English Pronouncing Dictionary gives /dʒuːn/ and /tʃuːz.deɪ/ as the preferred pronunciations; the Longman Pronunciation Dictionary and the Oxford Dictionary of Pronunciation give /djuːn/ and /tjuːzdeɪ/ as their first preference, but give /dʒuːn/ and /tʃuːz.deɪ/ as second preference. It cannot be said that the presence of yod-coalescence distinguishes EE from RP.

th-fronting
It has been suggested that th-fronting is "currently making its way" into Estuary English, for example those from the Isle of Thanet often refer to Thanet as "Plannit Fannit" (Planet Thanet). However, this feature was also present in the traditional dialect of Essex before the spread of Estuary English.

Other vowel differences

Before the dark l, it is sometimes a centering diphthong .
Front pronunciations (and ) are more often encountered in female speakers. Before the l, it is always back.
  can be central (rounded  or unrounded ) near-front , or simply near-back , as in RP. Only the last variant appears before the dark l.
The first two variants occur mostly before . The last two variants are more often used by females.
A somewhat retracted front  has been reported for some speakers in Reading.

Features distinguishing EE from Cockney

Wells suggests that EE differs from Cockney in a few key features.
 
 EE differs from Cockney in usually not being characterized by h-dropping before stressed vowels (informal example: " 'and on 'eart" for "hand on heart")
 Th-fronting (e.g. "I fink" for "I think", but see above)
 Cockney may have monophthongal realization of the MOUTH vowel ("Sahfend" for "Southend").

Use
Estuary English is widely encountered throughout southeast England, particularly among the young. It is considered to be a working-class accent, although often used by the lower middle classes too. In the debate that surrounded a 1993 article about Estuary English, a London businessman claimed that RP was perceived as unfriendly, so Estuary English was now preferred for commercial purposes. 
Some adopt the accent as a means of "blending in" to appear to be more working class or in an attempt to appear to be "a common man". That affectation of the accent is sometimes derisively referred to as "Mockney". A move away from traditional RP accents is almost universal among middle-class young people in the South-East of England.

19th-century Rural Estuary English

Older rural dialects of the Estuary region survived longest in areas like Kent and the east of Essex, which early on showed features of, as well as some features distinct from, the modern Estuary dialect that has since become regionally widespread. Notably, rhoticity was a feature of older rural English in most of the Estuary counties, now largely replaced by non-rhoticity.

See also
List of dialects of the English language
Regional accents of English speakers
English language in southern England
Multicultural London English
Sussex dialect

References

Bibliography

Further reading

External links
Sounds Familiar?Listen to regional dialects of the UK.
Estuary English from University College London

English language in England
English language in London
South East England
Thames Estuary